Ntokozo Percival Sikhakhane (born 28 March 1983 in Durban, KwaZulu-Natal) is a retired South African football player who played as a midfielder for Bidvest Wits in the Premier Soccer League.

He was born in KwaMashu, Durban.

Joined Wits: 2011
Previous clubs: AmaZulu, Bloemfontein Celtic, Kaizer Chiefs, Dynamos

External links
Player's profile at absapremiership.co.za

1983 births
South African soccer players
Living people
Association football midfielders
Sportspeople from Durban
Kaizer Chiefs F.C. players
Bloemfontein Celtic F.C. players
AmaZulu F.C. players
Bidvest Wits F.C. players
Dynamos F.C. (South Africa) players